Pensiangan is a small town in the state of Sabah in Malaysia. It is located in the Interior Division and is the capital of the district of Pensiangan. It is one of the most rural towns in Sabah located deep in the jungles of Borneo, and about 115 kilometres from the nearest coastline. It is also situated less than 20 kilometres from the Indonesian border.

Towns in Sabah